Siyabonga Praisegod Masuku (born ) is a South African rugby union player for the  in the Pro14. His regular position is fly-half.

External links
itsrugby.co.uk profile
ultimaterugby.com profile

References

South African rugby union players
Living people
1996 births
People from eDumbe Local Municipality
Rugby union fly-halves
Golden Lions players
Leopards (rugby union) players
Southern Kings players
Free State Cheetahs players
Cheetahs (rugby union) players
Rugby union players from KwaZulu-Natal